Lužany pri Topli is a village and municipality in Svidník District in the Prešov Region of north-eastern Slovakia.

History
In historical records the village was first mentioned in 1399.

Geography
The municipality lies at an altitude of 180 metres and covers an area of 3.240 km². It has a population of about 259 people. The Topľa river flows near the village.

External links
 
 
https://web.archive.org/web/20080111223415/http://www.statistics.sk/mosmis/eng/run.html

Villages and municipalities in Svidník District
Šariš